The American Baseball Coaches Association (ABCA) is the world's largest amateur baseball coaching organization. It was founded in 1945 as the American Association of College Baseball Coaches. Now, the ABCA is composed of over 13,000 baseball coaches from all levels of amateur baseball, including youth, high school, travel ball, NJCAA Divisions I, II, and III, NAIA, and NCAA Divisions I, II and III, among others.

History
The American Baseball Coaches Association (ABCA), founded in 1945, is the primary professional organization for baseball coaches at the amateur level. Its nearly 13,000 members represent all 50 states and 25 countries. Since its initial meeting of 27 college baseball coaches in June 1945, Association membership has broadened to include eight divisions: NCAA Division I, II and III, NAIA, NJCAA, Pacific Association Division, High School and Youth.

Read more about the association's inception and history.

Membership
The association has almost 13,000 members hailing from all 50 U.S. states and 25 different countries. The membership includes coaches from all ranks of amateur baseball as well as some coaches with pro affiliation. The membership year for the ABCA runs from September 1 through August 31.

Membership Benefits:

 Ability to attend the World's Largest Baseball Convention, which the association holds annually in January.
 ABCA Video Library access, which contains over 500 on-demand baseball coaching clinic videos. Videos include clinic presentations from past ABCA Conventions dating all the way back to 2008 as well as Barnstormers Regional Coaching Clinics, Webinars and more.
 Inside Pitch Magazine subscription, which is mailed every other month and also has a fully digital online archive.
 $1 million Personal Liability insurance coverage for U.S. residents while performing coaching duties.
 Attend ABCA Barnstormers Regional Coaching Clinics for free.
 ABCA Press Box weekly e-newsletter with links to the latest articles about baseball news, coaching tips and training.
 Membership Discount Program - discounts on ABCA Partner products such as baseball apparel, gear, training aids, technology and more! Members also receive discounts on hotel and rental car bookings for team and personal use.
 Free Job Board postings & Open Schedule Date Listings.
 Participate in surveys regarding rule changes and legislative issues affecting the sport and members' respective divisions.

National Convention
The ABCA hosts the world's largest baseball convention every January. The convention features coaching clinics, trade show, meetings, several awards presentations and honors. Over 7,000 coaches attend the convention, which lasts for four days.

The convention is on a rotating schedule around the United States. Upcoming locations include Chicago, Nashville, Dallas, Washington, D.C. and Las Vegas.

A major draw are the over 50 clinic speakers each year. These include some of the most knowledgeable baseball coaches and minds in the world and are on-hand to share their experiences and expertise with fellow coaches. Clinics run across the General Session, Youth Coaches Session and Expo Theater. The clinics are also live streamed online for members that cannot attend the Convention in person. After the convention, all clinics are available on-demand for members in the ABCA Video Library.

At the ABCA Trade Show, over 350 companies fill up over 200,000 square feet of exhibit space with state-of-the-art equipment and products, including coaching aids, apparel, field equipment, pitching machines and software. Many products are displayed for the first time and some items are even raffled off as prizes.

Barnstormers Regional Coaching Clinics
The ABCA hosts 20 regional coaching clinics throughout the United States and Canada each fall. The one-day clinics, known as Barnstormers Regional Coaching Clinics, feature presentations and on-field demonstrations by ABCA member coaches within that region. Presentations vary from video instruction to on-field demonstrations to live practice commentary, and focus on fundamentals, practical position-specific drills, coaching cues, and practice organization tips.

The clinics are free for members to attend! At least half of the clinic sites are filmed each year with the on-demand videos available on ABCAvideos.org.

My ABCA mobile app
The My ABCA mobile app was launched in Fall 2019 in both the Apple & Google Play Stores. Members and non-members can download the free app! Within the app, members can access their membership benefits year-round as well as stay up-to-date with ABCA news and content.

Additional features include the ability to collaborate with other members in forums and through direct messaging, register for the ABCA Convention and Barnstormer Regional Clinics, update member profiles and access the Coaching Resource Library.

The app allows users to view the ABCA Clinic Videos as well as tune in to the ABCA Podcast as well!

Hall of Fame
For members by year of induction, see footnote

Induction to the ABCA Hall of Fame is the highest honor bestowed by the ABCA organization. The ABCA Hall of Fame was established in 1966 with the inaugural 18–member class. Each year's Hall of Fame class is inducted during the Hall of Fame Banquet at the annual ABCA Convention in January. The entire ABCA Hall of Fame can be found online at ABCAhalloffame.org.

Awards

ABCA/ATEC Coaches of the Year

The prestigious ABCA/ATEC Sports National & Regional Coaches of the Year are selected by member coaches in 11 divisions. The Coaches of the Year are recognized annually at the ABCA Convention.
NCAA Division I National and Regional Coaches of the Year
NCAA Division II National and Regional Coaches of the Year
NCAA Division III National and Regional Coaches of the Year
NAIA National and Regional Coaches of the Year
NJCAA Division I National and Regional Coaches of the Year
NJCAA Division II National and Regional Coaches of the Year
NJCAA Division III National and Regional Coaches of the Year
Pacific Association Division National and Regional Coaches of the Year
High School National and Regional Coaches of the Year

ABCA National Assistant Coaches of the Year 

The ABCA Assistant Coach of the Year Award, selected in 11 divisions, recognizes coaching expertise, recruiting, loyalty to the program and respect for the players and the game, among other criteria. The Coaches of the Year are recognized annually at the ABCA Convention.
NCAA Division I National Assistant Coach of the Year
NCAA Division II National Assistant Coach of the Year
NCAA Division III National Assistant Coach of the Year
NAIA National Assistant Coach of the Year
NJCAA Division I National Assistant Coach of the Year
NJCAA Division II National Assistant Coach of the Year
NJCAA Division III National Assistant Coach of the Year
Pacific Association Division National Assistant Coach of the Year
High School National Assistant Coach of the Year

Lefty Gomez Award
The ABCA/Wilson Lefty Gomez Award has been presented since 1962. The award goes to an individual who has distinguished himself amongst his peers and has contributed significantly to the game of baseball locally, nationally and internationally. This award is sponsored by Wilson Sporting Goods.

ABCA/Dave Keilitz Ethics in Coaching Award
ABCA Ethics in Coaching Award honors individuals who embody the ABCA Code of Ethics. The ABCA strives for sportsmanship, ethics, and integrity to the highest degree.

ABCA/Rawlings All-America Teams 
The ABCA has selected All-American Teams in each division of the ABCA, as well as an All-American/Coach of the Year Committee, as well as All-Region Teams.  Each division also selects a National Player of the Year, as well as All-Region Coaches of the Year and National Coaches of the Year.  Each year, over 1,700 All-Region Players and 330 All-American Players are selected.

ABCA/Rawlings Position Players & Pitchers of the Year

ABCA/Rawlings Players of the Year:
NCAA Division I Position Player of the Year & Pitcher of the Year
NCAA Division II Position Player of the Year & Pitcher of the Year
NCAA Division III Position Player of the Year & Pitcher of the Year
NAIA Position Player of the Year & Pitcher of the Year
NJCAA Position Player of the Year & Pitcher of the Year
NJCAA Position Player of the Year & Pitcher of the Year
NJCAA Position Player of the Year & Pitcher of the Year
Pacific Association Division Position Player of the Year & Pitcher of the Year
High School Position Player of the Year & Pitcher of the Year

ABCA/Rawlings All-Americans
ABCA/Rawlings All-Americans:
NCAA Division I All-Americans (first, second, and third teams)
NCAA Division II All-Americans (first, second, and third teams)
NCAA Division III All-Americans (first, second, and third teams)
NAIA All-Americans (first, second, and third teams)
NJCAA Division I All-Americans (first, second, and third teams)
NJCAA Division II All-Americans (first, second, and third teams)
NJCAA Division III All-Americans (first, second, and third teams)
Pacific Association Division All-Americans (first, second, and third teams)
High School All-Americans (first, second, and third teams)

ABCA/Rawlings Gold Glove Awards
ABCA/Rawlings Gold Glove Awards:
NCAA Division I Gold Glove
NCAA Division II Gold Glove
NCAA Division III Gold Glove
NAIA Gold Glove
NJCAA Division I Gold Glove
NJCAA Division II Gold Glove
NJCAA Division III Gold Glove
Pacific Association Division Gold Glove
High School Gold Glove

ABCA/Rawlings All-Region
ABCA/Rawlings All-Region:
NCAA Division I All-Region
NCAA Division II All-Region
NCAA Division III All-Region
NAIA All-Region
NJCAA Division I All-Region
NJCAA Division II All-Region
NJCAA Division III All-Region
Pacific Association Division All-Region
High School All-Region

ABCA Team Academic Excellence Award
The ABCA Team Academic Excellence Award honors high school and college programs that posted a GPA over 3.0 on a 4.0 scale. Over 300 programs are recognized annually.

ABCA Century Club
The ABCA Century Club recognizes member coaches for every 100 victories they accumulate, awarding each with a certificate and recognition in ABCA publications.

ABCA Lifetime Membership
ABCA Lifetime Membership is awarded to coaches who have been members of the organization for 35 consecutive years and support to amateur baseball across the world. Currently, there are nearly 400 active Lifetime Members within the association. The newest Lifetime Members are honored each year at the annual ABCA Convention.

References

External links
ABCA official website
ABCA Hall of Fame official website
ABCA Videos on Demand official website

American Baseball
Baseball organizations

College baseball in the United States
Base
Baseball governing bodies in the United States
Sports organizations established in 1945
1945 establishments in the United States